Virginie is a French feminine given name. It may refer to :
Virginie Amélie Avegno Gautreau (1859–1915), French socialite
Virginie Atger (21st century), French jockey
Virginie Boutaud (born 1963), French Brazilian musician
Virginie Claes (born 1982), Belgian model
Virginie Cueff (born 1988), French racing cyclist
Virginie Déjazet (1798–1875), French actress
Virginie Despentes (born 1969), French novelist and filmmaker
Virginie Duby-Muller (born 1979), French politician
Virginie Efira (born 1977), Belgian actress
Virginie Gervais (born 1979), French model
Virginie Greiner (born 1969), French comic book scriptwriter 
Virginie Hériot (1890–1932), French sailor
Virginie Lagoutte-Clément (born 1979), French golfer
Virginie Ledieu (born 1960), French voice actress
Virginie Ledoyen (born 1976), French actress
Virginie Loveling (1836–1923), Flemish author
Virginie Pouchain (born 1980), French singer
Virginie Razzano (born 1983), French tennis player
Virginie Thévenet (born 1955), French actress
Virginie Viard (born 1962), French fashion designer, creative director of Chanel

French feminine given names